John A. Cosgrove (born June 7, 1954) is an American politician. On August 16, 2013, he was sworn in as a member of the Senate of Virginia, representing the 14th district, after winning an August 6 special election to replace the retiring Harry Blevins.

From 2002 to 2013 Cosgrove served in the Virginia House of Delegates, representing the 78th district in the city of Chesapeake. Cosgrove is a member of the Republican Party.

Cosgrove is a Virginia State Leader for the American Legislative Exchange Council (ALEC), which writes conservative model bills for state legislators to introduce.

Cosgrove is an advocate for gun rights. In 2017, the Virginia Citizens Defense League named him one of the most pro-gun politicians in the state. In 2017, Cosgrove mistakenly left his handgun unattended in an assembly meeting room.

Notes

External links
 (campaign finance)

1954 births
Living people
Republican Party members of the Virginia House of Delegates
Tidewater Community College alumni
Old Dominion University alumni
American electronics engineers
Politicians from Chesapeake, Virginia
Politicians from Montgomery, Alabama
Military personnel from Montgomery, Alabama
21st-century American politicians
Engineers from Virginia
Republican Party Virginia state senators